John Whiteway may refer to:
 John Whiteway (politician)
 John Whiteway (surgeon)